Felix Stieve (9 March 1845, in Münster – 10 June 1898, in Munich) was a German historian. He was the father of anatomist Hermann Stieve (1886–1952).

He studied history at the universities of Breslau, Berlin, Innsbruck and Munich, obtaining his habilitation at the latter institution in 1874. In 1878 he became a member of the Bavarian Academy of Sciences, and from 1886, taught classes as a professor at the Technische Hochschule in Munich.

Selected works 
 Der Kampf um Donauwörth im Zusammenhang der Reichsgeschichte (1875) – The Battle of Donauwörth in the context of the history of the Reich.
 Das kirchliche Polizeiregiment in Baiern unter Maximilian I, 1595-1651 (1876) – The ecclesiastical police regiment in Bavaria under Maximilian I.
 Der Kalenderstreit des sechzehnten Jahrhunderts in Deutschland (1880) – Calendar of the sixteenth century in Germany. 
 Der oberösterreichische Bauernaufstand des Jahres 1626 (1891) – The Upper Austrian peasant uprising of 1626.
 Abhandlungen, Vorträge und Reden (1900) – Essays, lectures and speeches.
He was the author of numerous biographies in the Allgemeine Deutsche Biographie, and published articles on Wilhelm von Giesebrecht and Ignaz von Döllinger in the Deutsche Zeitschrift für Geschichtswissenschaft. He also made significant contributions to the journal Zeitschrift des Historischen Vereins für Schwaben und Neuburg ("Journal of the Historical Association for Swabia and Neuburg").

References 

1845 births
1898 deaths
People from Münster
Ludwig Maximilian University of Munich alumni
19th-century German historians
Academic staff of the Technical University of Munich